In geometry, the de Longchamps point of a triangle is a triangle center named after French mathematician Gaston Albert Gohierre de Longchamps. It is the reflection of the orthocenter of the triangle about the circumcenter.

Definition

The Steiner circle of a triangle is concentric with the nine-point circle and has radius 3/2 the circumradius of the triangle; the de Longchamps point is the homothetic center of the Steiner circle and the circumcircle.

Additional properties
As the reflection of the orthocenter around the circumcenter, the de Longchamps point belongs to the line through both of these points, which is the Euler line of the given triangle. Thus, it is collinear with all the other triangle centers on the Euler line, which along with the orthocenter and circumcenter include the centroid and the center of the nine-point circle.
 
The de Longchamp point is also collinear, along a different line, with the incenter and the Gergonne point of its triangle. The de Longchamp point is the point of concurrence of this line with the Euler line, and with three other lines defined in a similar way as the line through the incenter but using instead the three excenters of the triangle.

It is the only cubic curve invariant of a triangle that is both isogonally self-conjugate and centrally symmetric; its center of symmetry is the circumcenter of the triangle. The de Longchamps point itself lies on this curve, as does its reflection the orthocenter.

References

External links

Triangle centers